The Macchi M.53 was an Italian reconnaissance floatplane designed and built in the late 1920s by Macchi for the Regia Marina (Italian Royal Navy).

Design and development
Macchi designed the M.53 to meet a Regia Marina requirement for a small reconnaissance seaplane that could operate from the large submarine Ettore Fieramosca. The aircraft had to be designed so that it could be stowed disassembled in a watertight, cylindrical hangar aboard the submarine. In order to minimize danger to the submarine and the aircraft during flight operations—which required Ettore Fieramosca to loiter on the surface while the aircraft was being assembled or disassembled—the aircraft also had to be designed so that it could be assembled quickly for flight operations and disassembled quickly after recovery for stowage in its hangar.

The M.53 was a single-seat low-wing monoplane floatplane with twin floats mounted beneath its fuselage. Its 60-kilowatt (80-horsepower) ADC Cirrus II engine drove a two-bladed propeller and gave it a top speed of 144 kilometers per hour (89.5 miles per hour).

Operational history
The M.53 was among various small seaplanes considered for use aboard Ettore Fieramosca, which was commissioned in 1930. None of the aircraft were deployed aboard the submarine, and Ettore Fieramoscas hangar was removed in 1931.

Operators

Regia Marina

Specifications (M.53)

See also

References

Bibliography

M.53
1920s Italian military reconnaissance aircraft
Floatplanes
Submarine-borne aircraft
Low-wing aircraft
Single-engined tractor aircraft